Priotrochus iris is a species of sea snail, a marine gastropod mollusk in the family Trochidae, the top snails.

Distribution
This marine species occurs in the Indian Ocean off Southeast Africa.

References

External links
 To World Register of Marine Species

iris
Gastropods described in 1988